Zsuzsa Nagy may refer to:
 Zsuzsa Nagy (gymnast)
 Zsuzsa Nagy (judoka)
 Zsuzsa Szabó, née Nagy, Hungarian runner